Nurlino (Nörlö) is a rural locality (a selo) in Nikolayevsky Selsoviet, Ufimsky District, Bashkortostan, Russia. The population was 1,892 as of 2010. There are 32 streets.

Geography 
Nurlino is located 34 km northwest of Ufa (the district's administrative centre) by road. Nikolayevka is the nearest rural locality.

References 

Rural localities in Ufimsky District